Valentin Barbu (born 15 May 1969) is a Romanian boxer. He competed in the men's light flyweight event at the 1992 Summer Olympics.

References

1969 births
Living people
Romanian male boxers
Olympic boxers of Romania
Boxers at the 1992 Summer Olympics
Place of birth missing (living people)
Light-flyweight boxers